Jaison David Ibarrola Silva (born 10 September 1986) is a Paraguayan footballer.

Career
Ibarrola began his career with the second division Paraguayan team Fernando de la Mora in 2005. The following year, he played for Club Nacional.

In 2007, Ibarrola moved to Chile to play for Deportes Concepción, and was transferred to Universidad Católica for the 2008 season.

Honours

Club
Millonarios
 Copa Colombia (1): 2011

References

External links
 Jaison Ibarrola at Football-Lineups
 
 

1986 births
Living people
Paraguayan footballers
Paraguayan expatriate footballers
Club Nacional footballers
Cerro Porteño players
Millonarios F.C. players
Deportes Concepción (Chile) footballers
Universidad de Concepción footballers
Club Deportivo Universidad Católica footballers
Deportivo Táchira F.C. players
Sportivo Luqueño players
Paraguayan Primera División players
Chilean Primera División players
Primera B de Chile players
Categoría Primera A players
Paraguayan expatriate sportspeople in Chile
Expatriate footballers in Chile
Expatriate footballers in Colombia
Expatriate footballers in Venezuela
Association football forwards